The Willow River is a  tributary of the Kettle River in eastern Minnesota in the United States.  It is one of three rivers by that name in Minnesota.  Via the Kettle and St. Croix rivers, it is part of the watershed of the Mississippi River.

Description
The Willow River flows for its entire length in northern Pine County.  It rises in the Nemadji State Forest in Nickerson Township and flows generally westwardly through Kerrick, Windemere, Norman and Kettle River townships, past Duquette.  In Windemere Township it collects the Little Willow River, which rises at the town of Kerrick and flows  through Bruno and Norman townships.  The Willow joins the Kettle River at the town of Willow River.

See also
List of Minnesota rivers
List of longest streams of Minnesota

References

Rivers of Minnesota
Rivers of Pine County, Minnesota
Tributaries of the Mississippi River